The National Service Act may refer to any one of a number of acts enforcing national service or conscription:
in the United States
Universal National Service Act
National Service Act of 2006
in Australia
National Service Act 1951
National Service Act 1964
in the UK
National Service (Armed Forces) Act 1939
National Service Act 1948